This is a list of socialist, communist, and anarchist internationals. An "International" — such as, the "First International", the "Second International", or the "Socialist International" — may refer to a number of multi-national communist, radical, socialist, or union organizations, typically composed of national sections.

Defunct internationals
Communist League, created in 1847 from the League of the Just, dissolved 1852
International Workingmen's Association (First International), 1864–1876
Anarchist St. Imier International, 1872–1877
International Working People's Association (Black International) 1881-?
Second International, 1889–1916
International Working Union of Socialist Parties (2½ International), 1921–1923
Communist International (Third International), 1919–1943
Communist Workers' International, 1922–mid-1920s
Labour and Socialist International, 1923–1940
International Revolutionary Marxist Centre, 1932–1940s
Revolutionary Workers Ferment 1948–unknown
Situationist International, 1957–1971
International League for the Reconstruction of the Fourth International, 1973–1995
Committee for a Workers' International, 1974–2019
Trotskyist International Liaison Committee, 1979–1984
Revolutionary Internationalist Movement, 1984–2012
International Communist Seminar, 1992–2014
International Libertarian Solidarity, 2001–2005
International Union of Anarchists  (Anarcho-communism) 2011–2013
International Conference of Marxist–Leninist Parties and Organizations (International Newsletter) (Maoism), 1988–2017
Coordinating Committee for the Refoundation of the Fourth International (Trotskyism), 2004–2017

Existing Internationals

International Communist Current (Left communism)

OTHER INTERNATIONALS:
 International Marxist Tendency (IMT), previously the Committee for a Marxist International
 International League of Peoples' Struggle (Anti-imperialism)

 International Meeting of Communist and Workers' Parties (Marxism–Leninism)
 International of Anarchist Federations (Synthesis anarchism, Anarcho-communism)

 International Workers' Association (Anarcho-syndicalism)

 World Socialist Movement (Classical Marxism, Impossibilism)
 Progressive International (Progressism, Socialism)
 International Conference of Marxist–Leninist Parties and Organizations (Unity & Stru
 
 
 ggle) (Hoxhaism)
 International Coordination of Revolutionary Parties and Organizations (Anti-revisionism)
 Humanist International (Humanism, Anti Imperialism, Anti-Capitalism)

STALINIST, MAOIST AND HOXAIST INTERNATIONALS
 International Conference of Marxist–Leninist Parties and Organizations (Unity & Struggle) (Hoxhaism)
 International Coordination of Revolutionary Parties and Organizations (Anti-revisionism)
 -Maoism）
 Communist International（Stalinist-Hoxhaist） (Stalinism-Hoxhaism）

 International Communist League (Marxism-Leninism-Maoism）
 Communist International（Stalinist-Hoxhaist） (Stalinism-Hoxhaism）

TROTSKYIST INTERNATIONALS:
 Committee for a Workers' International (CWI) - claims to be refoundation of Committee for a Workers' International (1974)
 Committee for Revolutionary International Regroupment (CRIR)
 Fourth International (reunified)
 International Committee of the Fourth International (ICFI)
 International Committee of the Fourth International (Workers Revolutionary Party) 
 International Communist League (Fourth Internationalist) (ICL-FI), previously the International Spartacist Tendency

 International Revolutionary Left, split from CWI
 International Socialist Alternative, claims to be successor to Committee for a Workers' International (1974)
 International Socialist League (ISL-LIS)
 International Socialist Tendency (IST (post-trotskyist))
 Internationalist Communist Union (ICU)
 International Trotskyist Committee for the Political Regeneration of the Fourth International (ITC)
 International Workers League – Fourth International (IWL-FI)
 International Workers' Unity – Fourth International (IWU-FI)
 League for the Fifth International (L5I)
 League for the Fourth International (LFI) [split from (ICL-FI)]
 League for the Revolutionary Party – Communist Organization for the Fourth International
 Organising Committee for the Reconstitution of the Fourth International (OCRFI), split from Fourth International (ICR) in 2016
 Trotskyist Fraction – Fourth International (TF-FI)
 Workers International to Rebuild the Fourth International (WIRFI)
 International Bolshevik Tendency
 Bolshevik Tendency
 International Leninist Trotskyist Tendency
 Permanent Revolution Collective
 International Leninist Trotskyist Fraction
 Tendency for the Reconstruction of the Fourth International
 Internationalist Trotskyist Nucleus-Fourth International
 Fourth International Posadist
 Liaison Committee for the Reconstruction of the Fourth International (CERCI)
International Communist Party (Left communism)

Regional internationals

Communist Party of the Soviet Union (2001) (Marxism–Leninism, Post-Soviet states)
Coordination Committee of Maoist Parties and Organisations of South Asia (Maoism, South Asia)
European Anti-Capitalist Left (Democratic socialism, Europe)
Foro de São Paulo (Socialism of the 21st Century, Latin America)
Initiative of Communist and Workers' Parties (Marxism–Leninism, Europe)
Now the People (Democratic socialism, Europe)
Party of the European Left (Democratic socialism, Europe)
Union of Communist Parties – Communist Party of the Soviet Union (Marxism–Leninism, Post-Soviet states)
Conference of Communist and Worker's Parties of the Balkans(Marxism–Leninism,Balkan)

See also
List of Trotskyist internationals
Fifth International
List of international labor organizations
Political international

References

External links

Lists of leftist organisations

 
Communism
Socialism